Tarun Arora is an Indian model, actor and producer who works in Hindi, Telugu and Tamil language films.

Career 
Tarun Arora began modelling while studying hotel management in Bangalore. He won the Gladrags Manhunt in 1998. He was later seen in advertisement campaigns for brands like Raymond, Westside, Kwality Walls, McDowell's whiskey, and LG, and walked the runway for several designers. He also appeared in the music video, Dil Chori, by Hans Raj Hans.

Arora filmed his first Bollywood role in 1999, in Pyaar Mein Kabhi Kabhi. He had his first major role in the film, Hawas (2004). Over the next three years, he performed in several low-budget films like Sheen (2004), 19 Revolutions (2004), Men Not Allowed (2006) and Ghuttan (2007). In 2007, he performed in the film, Jab We Met, in which he played the role of Kareena Kapoor's lover, who rejects her and comes back, only to get rejected himself. The film was a major hit at the box office. In 2009, he appeared two films: 2 and Love Guru. He received praise for his role in the 2016 film, Kanithan, and he played the main antagonist in the Chiranjeevi starrer, Khaidi No. 150 (2017).

Personal life
Arora is married to actress Anjala Zaveri.

Filmography

References

External links 
 
 Tarun Arora Profile. Bollywood Hungama
 

Male actors in Hindi cinema
Indian male film actors
Living people
Indian male models
Male actors in Telugu cinema
Male models
1979 births